Galway Corinthians Rugby Football Club is a rugby club in Galway, Ireland and the largest rugby union club in the province of Connaught. The club was founded in 1932 and plays in Division 2B of the Irish domestic club competition the All-Ireland League. The club's home ground is at Corinthian Park, Cloonacauneen, Co. Galway.

Foundation and early history 

On 13 September 1932 a brief report in the pages of the Connacht Sentinel announced the formation of a new rugby club in Galway. Its membership was drawn largely from Galway's inner city and working class and was composed in the main of students and players of St Joseph's Patrician College (The Bish) and the Galway Grammar School. The following evening the Club held its first meeting in the Mechanic's Institute in Middle Street at 8 pm, and from that meeting its first Senior Committee emerged:

Harry Warner - founding President; M Gallagher - Vice President; J Toner - Hon Treasurer; J Brown - Hon Secretary; J Owens - Assistant Secretary; T Mullins, G Mahont, M Roche, P O'Flaherty, W Lenihan, P Griffin, T Liodain - Committee Members.

Past players
Simon Allnutt
Tim Allnutt
Eoin Griffin
Noel Mannion
Shane McDonald
Steve McIvor
Johnny O'Connor
Eoghan Masterson
Kieran Marmion

References

External links
Official website

Irish rugby union teams
Rugby union clubs in County Galway
Rugby clubs established in 1932
Sport in Galway (city)
Senior Irish rugby clubs (Connacht)